Randall Thompson (1899–1984) was an American composer, particularly noted for his choral works.

Randal Thompson may also refer to:

Randall Thompson (boxer) (born 1964), retired Canadian boxer
Randall Thompson, fictional character in General Hospital